Central Health may refer to:
 Central Health (Newfoundland and Labrador) (Canada)
 Central Health (Texas) (United States)